The Nederlandse Natuurkundige Vereniging (NNV)  is the national physical society of the Netherlands and a member of the European Physical Society. Established in 1921, the goals of the society are to promote physics and to serve the interests of physicists in the Netherlands. Its main activities are publishing the Dutch physics journal Nederlands Tijdschrift voor Natuurkunde (NTvN) and the organisation of an annual physics conference.

Sections
The NNV has the following sections that focus on either a particular field of physics or a specific topic of interest to physicists:
 Atomic, Molecular and Optical physics
 Energy and Climate
 History and Foundations of Physics 
 Education and Communication 
 Physics of Plasmas and Gas discharges 
 Subatomic Physics

References

Physics societies
Scientific organizations established in 1921
Scientific organisations based in the Netherlands
1921 establishments in the Netherlands